St Lucia is a settlement in Umkhanyakude District Municipality in the KwaZulu-Natal province of South Africa. The small town is mainly a hub for the iSimangaliso Wetland Park.

History
Evidence of early humans living in the caves up high in the Lebombo Mountains dating back 130,000 years ago provided scientists with clues regarding the lifestyle of these prehistoric settlers. From this cave alone some 69,000 stone implements and various human remains have been recovered. Some of these tools date back to the middle and early stone ages (130,000 to 30,000 years ago).

St Lucia was first named in 1554 as Rio dos Medos do Ouro (alternatively Rio dos Médãos do Ouro — River of the Gold Dunes) by the survivors of the Portuguese ship São Bento. At this stage, only the Tugela River mouth was known as St. Lucia. Later, in 1575, the Tugela River was named Tugela. On 13 December 1575, the day of the feast of Saint Lucy, Manuel Peresterello renamed the mouth area to Santa Lucia.

In 1822, St Lucia was proclaimed by the British as a township. In 1895, St Lucia Game Reserve, 30 km north of the town, was proclaimed. Since 1971, St Lucia Lake and the turtle beaches and coral reefs of Maputaland have been listed by the Convention on Wetlands of International Importance (Ramsar Convention). In December 1999, the park was listed as a UNESCO World Heritage Site.

Synthpop band St. Lucia is named after the town.

Demographics
The largest ethnic group in St Lucia are White South Africans of English descent who make up 30.9% of St Lucia residents. The second largest ethnic group in St. Lucia are Zulu people, who make up 26.4% of St Lucia residents.

Animals in the park 

The park is also home to about 1,200 Nile Crocodiles and almost 800 hippopotamuses. Hippos often roam the streets at night.

Other animals include leopards, Greater Kudu, Black Rhinos, rich avifauna and numerous invertebrates.

Climate 
Under Köppen-Geiger climate classification system, it has a humid subtropical climate (Cfa).

References

External links 
 http://www.isimangaliso.com

Populated places in the Mtubatuba Local Municipality